The British High Commission in Nairobi is the diplomatic mission of the United Kingdom in Nairobi.  It is located in the Upper Hill area of Nairobi. The current British High Commissioner to Kenya is Jane Marriott, appointed in September 2019.

The Upper Hill area also houses the embassies of Japan and Spain, and the European Union's Kenya office.

History
Kenya was a colony of the United Kingdom, therefore diplomatic relations were established with the creation of the Kenya Colony in 1920. The United Kingdom was represented in Kenya by a governor. Kenya gained independence from the United Kingdom in 1963, with both countries establishing high commissions as fellow members of the Commonwealth of Nations.

Functions
The United Kingdom and Kenya conduct their diplomatic relations at governmental level. The High Commission also houses the Kenyan offices of the Department for International Development and UK Trade and Investment. The British Council's Kenya office is located adjacent to the High Commission building.

The High Commissioner to Kenya is the UK Representative to the United Nations Environment Programme and the United Nations Human Settlements Programme, which are headquartered at the United Nations Office at Nairobi. The High Commission also represents the British Overseas Territories in Kenya.

See also
 Diplomatic missions of the United Kingdom
 List of High Commissioners of the United Kingdom to Kenya

References

United Kingdom
Nairobi
Kenya–United Kingdom relations